Vils can refer to:

three rivers in Germany and Austria:
Vils (Danube), a tributary of the Danube, in eastern Bavaria
Vils (Naab), a tributary of the Naab, in northern Bavaria
Vils (Lech), a tributary of the Lech, in Tyrol and south-western Bavaria
Vils, Tyrol, a town in Tyrol, Austria